Lee H. Katzin (April 12, 1935 – October 30, 2002) was an American film director.

Early life and education 
He was born in Detroit, Michigan and became a TV director in the late 1960s for TV shows that included Bonanza, Mission: Impossible and Police Story. He also directed the 1971 feature film Le Mans.

Career 
Starting in 1969, he did an array of theatrical films starting with Heaven with a Gun and other films like The Break and the cult classic What Ever Happened to Aunt Alice? In 1972, he directed the film The Salzburg Connection, which starred Barry Newman and Anna Karina.

In 1975, he directed the launch episode "Breakaway", and other early episodes, of the Gerry Anderson live-action series Space: 1999. He also directed the pilots for the television series Man from Atlantis and Spenser: For Hire. He was primarily known as a prolific episodic television director, and he worked on series such as MacGyver,  Police Story, The Young Riders, and Mission Impossible.

He died of cancer at the age of 67 in 2002 in Beverly Hills, California.

Partial filmography 
 Hondo and the Apaches (1966)
 What Ever Happened to Aunt Alice? (1969)
 Heaven with a Gun (1969)
 The Phynx (1970)
 Le Mans (1971)
 The Salzburg Connection (1972)
 The Stranger (1973)
 Savages (1974)
 Zuma Beach (1978)
 The Dirty Dozen: The Deadly Mission (1987)
 The Dirty Dozen: The Fatal Mission (1988)
 World Gone Wild (1988)
 The Break (1995)
 Restraining Order (2000)

References

External links 

1935 births
2002 deaths
American television directors
Deaths from cancer in California
Artists from Detroit
Film directors from Michigan